Thanatomorphose is a 2012 Canadian body horror film directed by Éric Falardeau. It was his directorial debut. it was first released on October 2, 2012, in Spain and has been shown at several film festivals since then, including the Fantasia Film Festival. Thanatomorphose stars Kayden Rose as a young woman that finds her body slowly rotting from a mysterious ailment.

Plot
Laura (Kayden Rose) is a depressed and introspective young woman who lives alone in her small apartment. After she has sexual relations with her abusive boyfriend Antoine (Davyd Tousignant), Laura bandages his foot after he is injured by stepping on a sharp nail on the floor, revealing that she is a nurse. They don't have a good relationship together and he is always quite distant from her and always leaves after they have sex. She is distracted by a patient clay carving and masturbates, where a red spot appears on her groin. When she takes a bath, one of her fingernails falls off and a new purple stain appears on her back. She starts preparing for a party after leaving to work and her friends arrive. Her cleaning mania is exposed when they dirty the floor and Laura ends up being mocked by her friends for it. Julian, one of their friends, seems sexually interested in Laura.

The party ends after the landlord kicks them out, Antoine has hardcore sex with Laura, where she falls ill in the middle of the night and vomits all over him. Laura staggers into the bathroom and ends up breaking a glass, scattering its shards on the floor. Laura wakes up naked without Antoine by her side. She goes to drink water from the sink and doesn't notice that the drain is full of her blood. After she steps on shards of glass from last night, she slips and hits her head on the floor. The woman dreams of a rotting carcass in an advanced decomposition state. She wakes up at night with a pool of blood from the wound on the back of her head. After bandaging herself, she takes some medication and is visited by Julian, who notices the bruises all over her naked body. She receives oral sex from him and before he leaves and Laura spends the rest of the day sleeping.

Laura wakes up in the morning with difficulty and defecates standing up before passing out again. She dreams that she is being operated on in a clandestine laboratory by a doctor who is cutting off her hand to feed Antoine and Julian naked in a cage. Laura wakes up even weaker and with her skin getting even more decomposed. She tries to take a shower and clean her open wounds, but it doesn't do much good. She performs a suture to close a rotten wound on her hand, covering it with a bandage as soon as more of her nails fall out. After noticing that her head injury is not improving she covers all the windows and mirrors with black sheets.

Laura begins to collect the parts of her body that are falling off, along with tufts of hair and bits of her fingers into jars. She photographs its evolution and starts using its body parts to make bloody sculptures. Laura  masturbates while remembering that Antoine visited her and seeing her deplorable condition, tried to help her wash up. Antoine ends up being killed by her with several hammer blows to the head, as she recalls this while masturbating, she bleeds. Her apartment begins to look with traces of black blood and flesh scattered throughout. She examines herself in the mirror and removes some maggots from her raw chest with tweezers without feeling pain.

The next day, she develops the photographs and ordered the pots with her pieces. She calls Julian to visit her and when he does, he sees her rotting body on the mattress, begging her to have sex with him. Julian refuses and is stabbed to death by her. Her state of decomposition worsens and her skin turns black with maggots surrounding her flesh, and she has a psychedelic dream of being buried in a coffin. She makes one last sculpture with pieces of Julian and herself, ripping off parts of her skin to complete her artwork. She looks at herself in the mirror one last time and stabs her milky eyes with her fingers before crawling closer to Julian and Antoine's rotting bodies. She slowly dies as the final stages of the rot make her flesh ooze from her carcass and her jaw drop from her skull, revealing her bloody skeleton on the ground.

Cast
 Kayden Rose as Laura
 Davyd Tousignant as Antoine
 Émile Beaudry as Julian
 Karine Picard as Anne
 Roch-Denis Gagnon as Stephan
 Eryka Cantieri as Marie (as Eryka L. Cantieri)
 Pat Lemaire
 Simon Laperrière

Reception
Critical reception for Thanatomorphose has been mixed, and since its release the film has been compared to Contracted, a similarly plotted film released in 2013. Ain't It Cool News gave a mixed review that praised the film's special effects but warning that the film would not appeal to all audiences due to its content. Fearnet gave a similar review, saying that it was "not the kind of horror film I'd want to watch every week – and I may even find it difficult to recommend – but I'd be lying if I said Thanatomorphose didn't fascinate, aggravate, and impress me at the same time." Dread Central panned the movie, giving it one and a half blades and criticizing it as "all grue, little substance".

Awards
Best Movie Award, XXX Festival de Cine de Terror de Molins de Rei (2012)
Best Special Effects Award, A Night of Horror International Film Festival (2012)
Best Film, Best Director, Best Actress, Most Repulsive Flick Awards, Housecore Horror Film Festival (2013)
Best Horror Film, The Philip K. Dick Film Festival (2013)
Best Special Effects Award, Horrorant Film Festival 'FRIGHT NIGHTS' (2014)

See also
 Contracted
 Bite

References

External links
 
 

2012 films
Canadian splatter films
Canadian body horror films
Canadian independent films
2012 horror films
2012 directorial debut films
English-language Canadian films
2010s English-language films
2010s Canadian films